The Anti-Poverty Committee (APC) was a militant left-wing anarchist organisation based in Vancouver, British Columbia that campaigned against poverty and homelessness.

The APC participated in direct action events such as sit-ins, squats, and vandalism to protest the closure of low-income housing projects and garnered considerable attention with disruptive protests centred on the 2010 Winter Olympics in Vancouver, including the instigation of a small-scale riot on the opening day of the games.

According to its website, the Anti-Poverty Committee was "an organization of poor and working people, who fight for poor people, their rights and an end to poverty by any means necessary." The APC ceased meeting in the summer of 2010, when they stopped renting an office space for meetings, and is no longer an active organization.

Opposition to the 2010 Winter Olympics
On a May weekend in 2007, Vancouver Police used a ruse to arrest APC organizer David Cunningham as part of their investigation into threats made to "evict" 2010 Winter Olympic Games board members from their homes and offices. The police had pretended to be a reporter with Vancouver's commuter newspaper 24 Hours. This ruse was criticised in newspaper editorials as endangering the media's appearance of independence. 

On May 22, 2007, following Cunningham's arrest, three APC activists pretended to be delivering flowers as a ruse to gain entry to the Vancouver offices of BC Premier Gordon Campbell. The group began destroying glassware, as well as overturning furniture and scattering documents. The group stated that this action was an eviction of 2010 Winter Olympic Games special advisor Ken Dobell from his office.

See also
 Downtown Eastside Residents Association
 Poverty in Canada

References

External links
 Official website.

Homelessness organizations
Affordable housing advocacy organizations
Political advocacy groups in Canada
Organizations based in Vancouver
Homelessness in Canada